Very Idham Henyansyah (February 1, 1974), also known as Ryan, is an Indonesian convicted serial killer. Henyansyah confessed to killing 11 people and was sentenced to death by the Indonesia criminal court after being arrested in 2008. He is awaiting execution at Kesambi Penitentiary in Cirebon.

Henyansyah case achieved notoriety throughout Indonesia due to the gruesome nature of the murders. Known for his uncontrollable temper, Ryan bashed the heads of a mother and her child to death with a metal bar after they made him angry. The body of one of the victims was found at a roadside in Jakarta cut up into seven pieces and was skewered with a crowbar. Henyansyah buried his other victims' bodies in the backyard of his home in Jombang Regency in East Java.

After his arrest, Henyansyah became known as the "singing serial killer", entertaining the court officers, fellow inmates, and media audience from his jail cell by singing a song from his upcoming album.

In February 2009, Henyansyah released an autobiography titled The Untold Story of Ryan. In the autobiography, Henyansyah indicated that he was formerly a Qur'an recital teacher and later became a male model.

Henyansyah is openly homosexual and has confessed that all but three of his victims were also homosexual men. He admitted to killing one of his victims after the victim offered him money and a car to have sex with his boyfriend. However, in October 2010, Henyansyah announced that he was planning to marry a female convicted drug dealer, Eny Wijaya, whom he had met in 2008 when they were both detained at the Jakarta Police Narcotics Detention Center. Eny Wijaya was released from Pondok Bambu Penitentiary around September 2010. One of his stated reasons for marrying Eny Wijaya, despite being homosexual, is to fulfill his mother's wish that he be married to a woman.

See also
List of serial killers by country
List of serial killers by number of victims

References

1974 births
Indonesian murderers of children
Indonesian people convicted of murder
Indonesian prisoners sentenced to death
Indonesian serial killers
Javanese people
LGBT Muslims
Indonesian LGBT people
Living people
Male serial killers
Prisoners sentenced to death by Indonesia
People convicted of murder by Indonesia
Violence against gay men
Violence against men in Asia